Michael Baker is an American-British former Central Intelligence Agency officer and security expert, technical advisor for the entertainment industry, TV commentator, and host.

Career
Baker spent approximately 15 years with the CIA, working as a covert field operations officer specializing in counterterrorism, counternarcotics and counterinsurgency operations. After this he retired from government, and went to work in the private sector, serving as CEO of security firm Veritas Global.

He has worked as a technical advisor in the entertainment industry. Baker has appeared on Fox News' Red Eye w/ Tom Shillue, Deadliest Warrior, Spy, Opie & Anthony Show, The Joe Rogan Experience, and The Greg Gutfeld Show. He also hosts the television series Black Files Declassified on the Science Channel and Amazon Prime Video.

References

External links
 
 
 
 
 

1961 births
Living people
People from Bideford
Businesspeople from Idaho
American television personalities
British people of American descent
British expatriates in the United States
Naturalized citizens of the United States
People of the Central Intelligence Agency
20th-century American people
21st-century American people
20th-century British people
21st-century British people